Annemarie Hase (1900 – 1971) was a German actress and cabaret artist. She emerged as a star during the Weimar Republic, but because she was Jewish she faced increasing persecution following the Nazi takeover in 1933. In 1936 she went into exile in Britain, where she remained for the next decade. She was involved with various exile groups, and was employed by the BBC during the Second World War where she worked alongside Bruno Adler.

Following the Allied victory over the Nazis, and occupation of Germany she returned to Berlin. In 1947 she appeared in the rubble film And the Heavens Above Us alongside Hans Albers and Lotte Koch. She forged a career as a character actress, appearing in a number of East German films. She was known for her Socialist political views.

Filmography

References

Bibliography 
 Wallace, Ian (ed.) German-Speaking Exiles in Great Britain. Rodopi, 1999.
 Shandley, Robert R. Rubble Films: German Cinema in the Shadow of the Third Reich. Temple University Press, 2001.

External links 
 

1900 births
1971 deaths
German stage actresses
German film actresses
German socialists
Actresses from Berlin
Jewish emigrants from Nazi Germany to the United Kingdom
Singers from Berlin
20th-century German actresses
20th-century German women singers